The 2002 ICC Champions Trophy was a cricket tournament that was held in Sri Lanka in 2002. It was the third edition of the ICC Champions Trophy – the first two having been known as the ICC Knock Out Tournaments. The tournament was due to be held in India, but was switched to Sri Lanka when an exemption from tax in India was not granted. Fifteen matches were to be played in the tournament including two semi-finals and a final match. It was the first time that the teams of all International Cricket Council (ICC) member nations visited Sri Lanka to participate in a cricket tournament.

Twelve teams competed: the 10 Test-playing nations plus Kenya who has full One Day International (ODI) status and the 2001 ICC Trophy winners the Netherlands. The teams were split into four pools of three teams each. Each team played the other two teams in its pool once, and the four teams that led in each pool proceeded to the Semi-finals. Australia lost to Sri Lanka in the first semi-final whereas India defeated South Africa in the second semi final. The final between India and Sri Lanka was washed out twice, to leave no result. Virender Sehwag was the highest run-scorer of the tournament and Muttiah Muralitharan was the highest wicket-taker.

Prize money
The total prize money for the 2002 ICC Champions Trophy was $100.15 million, and in addition, the 12 teams received $165,000 each for taking part in the tournament. The winning team of the tournament collected $525,000: $100,000 for winning both of its Pool matches, $125,000 for winning semi-final and $300,000 for winning the final.

Venues 
All the matches were played in Colombo at two grounds: R. Premadasa Stadium and Sinhalese Sports Club Ground.

Tournament structure
Unlike the previous two editions of the Champions Trophy which had a direct knockout format, this edition had a format in which teams divided into pools instead. The 12 teams—10 Test playing nations (plus Kenya and Netherlands)—were divided into four pools of three teams each, with every team playing two matches. Australia, Bangladesh and New Zealand were placed in Pool 1 whereas England, India and Zimbabwe were allotted Pool 2. Kenya, South Africa and West Indies were put together in Pool 3, and Netherlands, Pakistan and Sri Lanka played each other in Pool 4. The semi finals were played between the winners of Pool 2 and the winners of Pool 3, and Pool 1 and Pool 4.

Participating teams

Source

Points Table
Australia, India, South Africa and Sri Lanka topped their respective Pools by winning their Pool matches, and qualified into the semi-finals. Australia faced Sri Lanka in the first semi-final while in the second semi-final India played South Africa.

Points per win: 4

Pool matches
The first match of the tournament was played between Sri Lanka and Pakistan on 12 September 2002. Sri Lanka won the match by eight wickets with Sanath Jayasuriya scoring his thirteenth ODI century. He reached 8,000 runs in ODI during his innings. Sri Lanka reached into the semi-finals by winning their next match against the Netherlands by 202 runs. Australia, from the Pool 1, qualified for the semi-finals after defeating Bangladesh by nine wickets at the Sinhalese Sports Club Ground, Colombo. In their first Pool match, Australia had defeated New Zealand by 164 runs. They played Sri Lanka in the second semi-final of the tournament.

South Africa, who had defeated the West Indies in their opening match, made their place into the semi-finals from Pool 3 by winning over Kenya. They defeated Kenya by 176 runs with man of the match Herschelle Gibbs scoring 116 runs. The fourth semi-finalist of the tournament was India, who defeated Zimbabwe and England in the Pool matches. Virender Sehwag scored 126 runs against England. India faced South Africa in the first semi-final of the tournament.

Pool 1

Pool 2

Pool 3

Pool 4

Knockout matches

Semifinals
The first semi-final was played between India and South Africa on 25 September 2002 at the R. Premadasa Stadium, Colombo. India batted first and scored 261 runs for nine wickets in 50 overs. Yuvraj Singh, Virender Sehwag and Rahul Dravid scored 62, 59 and 49 runs respectively. South African fast bowler Shaun Pollock took three wickets for 43 runs. Chasing the target of 262, South Africa collapsed after reaching 192 runs for one wicket with Herschelle Gibbs scoring 116 and Jacques Kallis 97 runs in 37 overs. Gibbs could not continue his inning due to heat exhaustion. Sehwag got three wickets for 25 runs, and was given the man of the match award for his performance. India won the match by 10 runs and qualified for the final of the tournament.

The second semi-final was played between Sri Lanka and Australia on 27 September 2002 at the same ground. Australia batted first and scored 162 runs all out. Tail-ender Shane Warne scored 36 runs followed by Adam Gilchrist and Damien Martyn scoring 31 and 28 runs respectively. Sri Lankan off-spinner Muttiah Muralitharan took three wickets for 26 runs. Aravinda de Silva, who was awarded Man of the Match, conceded only 16 runs in 10 overs and took Matthew Hayden's wicket. Sri Lanka, in their innings, reached the target of 163 runs in 40 overs losing only three wickets. Opener Marvan Atapattu scored 51 runs followed by wicketkeeper-batsman Kumar Sangakkara and Sanath Jayasuriya scoring 48 and 42 runs respectively. Glenn McGrath took two wickets for 41 runs in 10 overs.

Final

The 2002 ICC Champions Trophy Final was played on 29 and 30 September 2002 at the R. Premadasa Stadium, Colombo. On 29 September, Sri Lanka scored 244 runs including Jayasuriya and Kumar Sangakkara scoring fifties, and Indian off-spinner Harbhajan Singh took three wickets for 27 in 10 overs. In reply, India started their batting and scored 14 runs without any loss in two overs before the match was abandoned due to heavy rain; the match was finished in no result. It was decided that the new match would be played on the reserve day.

On the reserve day the Sri Lankans again batted first, scoring 222 runs including Mahela Jayawardene and Russel Arnold scoring 77 and 56 runs respectively, and Indian Zaheer Khan took three wickets for 44 runs. India scored 38 runs in 8.4 overs and the match was abandoned due to rain without result. According to ICC rules, an ODI match is only official after 25 overs bowled to the side batting second. A Man of the Series award was not made.

Criticism
The International Cricket Council's (ICC) rule for One Day International (ODI) cricket at that time, "a minimum of 25 overs have to be bowled to the side batting second to constitute a match", was criticized by former Indian cricketers. Former Indian wicket-keeper Farokh Engineer rejected the rule saying that it "doesn't make any sense". Another former Test cricketer Sanjay Manjrekar said that the ICC "should look at that rule straight away and change it", and the "obvious thing is to continue from where they left off".

Tournament statistics
Indian opener Virender Sehwag was the highest run-scorer of the tournament. He scored 271 runs from four innings at the average of over 90, including a century and a fifty. His highest score was 126 runs against England. Followed by Sri Lankan captain Sanath Jayasuriya who scored 254 runs. Herschelle Gibbs of South Africa scored two centuries in the tournament. He also had the highest average of 120 from three innings. Zimbabwean Andy Flower's score of 145 against India was the highest individual score in a match.

Sri Lankan off-spinner Muttiah Muralitharan was the most successful bowler of the tournament. He took ten wickets in three innings, while his best bowling figures were four wickets for 15 runs against the Netherlands at the R. Premadasa Stadium. The only five-wicket haul of the tournament was taken by Australian fast bowler Glenn McGrath. He took five wickets for 37 runs against New Zealand at the Sinhalese Sports Club Ground.

Zimbabwean Alistair Campbell took five catches in two matches, and Sri Lankan wicketkeeper Kumar Sangakkara had the most dismissals with seven—five catches and two stumpings.

References

External links

 

 
2002
2002 in Sri Lankan cricket
International cricket competitions in 2002
International cricket competitions in 2002–03
Cricket, ICC Champions Trophy, 2002